Energy Cities is the European Association of local authorities in energy transition. It represents 1000 towns and cities in 30 countries. From 2017 to 2020, Energy Cities is under the Presidency of the City of Heidelberg (DE). Energy Cities was established as an association of European local authorities in 1990 to put all this into practice. The association premises are located in Brussels (BE) and Besançon (FR). A part of the team works in Budapest (HU), Offenburg (DE), Freiburg im Breisgau (DE) and Zürich (CH).

Board of directors

The Board of Directors of the association is represented by the 11 European cities:

Presidency of Energy Cities

 2005-2020 City of Heidelberg (DE), represented by Eckart Würzner, Deputy Mayor of Heidelberg
 2000-2005 City of Odense (DK), represented by Søren Møller, Deputy Mayor of Odense
 1997-2000 City of Barcelona (ES), represented by Pep Puig, Municipal Councillor in Barcelona
 1994-1997 City of Besançon (FR), represented by Robert Schwint, Mayor of Besançon
 1990-1994 Robert Schwint, Mayor of Besançon

See also
 Covenant of Mayors

References

External links
 Energy Cities Official Website
 Covenant of Mayors
 Display Campaign

Energy in the European Union
Energy policy
1990 establishments in Europe
Organizations established in 1990